CHAB may refer to:

 CHAB (AM), a radio station (800 AM) licensed to Moose Jaw, Saskatchewan, Canada
 CHAB-TV, a defunct television station in Moose Jaw, Saskatchewan, Canada